Pierce H. Cahill (January 9, 1869 – January 26, 1935) was a member of the South Dakota Senate from 1901 to 1904.

Cahill was born in Beetown, Wisconsin. He moved with his parents to Green Lake, Wisconsin, where he was educated. In 1889, Cahill moved to South Dakota, where he became a farmer and livestock dealer. He lived in Albee in Grant County, South Dakota. He was a Republican. He died of internal injuries at the hospital in Milbank after a car-train accident at Albee.

References

External links
 

People from Grant County, South Dakota
People from Beetown, Wisconsin
Republican Party South Dakota state senators
Businesspeople from South Dakota
1869 births
1935 deaths
People from Green Lake, Wisconsin
Road incident deaths in South Dakota